John Coatta (April 5, 1929 – December 26, 2000) was an American football player and coach.  He served as the head coach at the Wisconsin Badgers from 1967 to 1969 and at Mankato State College, now Minnesota State University, Mankato, from 1970 to 1975, compiling a career college football record of 38–50–3.  Coatta played quarterback at Wisconsin from 1949 to 1951 and in 1950, he set the Big Ten Conference season pass completion percentage record (64.2%), a mark that he held until 1977.

Coaching career
In 1959, Coatta left private business in Madison, Wisconsin to accept an assistant football coaching job at Florida State University under Perry Moss and subsequently Bill Peterson.  From 1959 to 1964, he coached a number of positions at the school.  He then returned to Wisconsin as an assistant coach under Milt Bruhn for two seasons after which he was promoted to head coach.

During his head coaching tenure at Wisconsin, Coatta compiled a 3–26–1 (.117) record.  He set an NCAA record for most consecutive games without a win to begin a career with 23.  Coatta did not win a game in his first two seasons. His three wins came in 1969 against Iowa, 23–17, Indiana, 36–34, and Illinois, 53–14.  Allegedly, the Badgers passed on future Michigan head coach Bo Schembechler when they hired Coatta.  Schembechler was the head coach at Miami University at the time.

After Minnesota State temporarily dropped football after the 1975 season, Coatta joined the staff of Cal Stoll at the University of Minnesota as offensive coordinator and quarterbacks coach from 1977 to 1978.  He later scouted for the National Football League's Dallas Cowboys and Seattle Seahawks.

Head coaching record

References

1929 births
2000 deaths
American football quarterbacks
Dallas Cowboys scouts
Florida State Seminoles football coaches
Minnesota Golden Gophers football coaches
Minnesota State Mavericks football coaches
Seattle Seahawks scouts
Wisconsin Badgers football coaches
Wisconsin Badgers football players
Sportspeople from Dearborn, Michigan